Vilicus was a servant who had the superintendence of the villa rustica, and of all the business of the farm, except the cattle, which were under the care of the magister pecoris. The duties of the vilicus were to follow the estate owner's instructions, and to govern the slaves with moderation, never to leave the villa except to go to market, to have no intercourse with soothsayers, to take care of the cattle and the implements of husbandry, and to manage all the operations of the farm villa. His duties and those of his wife (the vilica) are described by Columella (Res rustica, I.8, XI.1, and XII.1), and by Cato (De Agri Cultura, cxlii–cxliii, focusing on the vilica).

The word was also used to describe a person to whom the management of any business was entrusted (see the passage quoted in Forcellini's Lexicon).

Ancient Roman titles